is an economic botanist at the Tokyo Metropolitan University, the Makino Botanical Garden in Kōchi Prefecture, Japan.

Tanaka is an expert on the family Cannaceae, and in 2001 published a revision of the family Cannaceae in the New World and Asia.
Another contribution by Dr. Tanaka is to revise the Flora of Myanmar.

Publications
Nobuyuki Tanaka (2004): The utilization of edible Canna plants in southeastern Asia and southern China in Economic Botany 52 (1) pp 112–114 The New York Botanical Garden.
Ito, Y., T. Ohi-Toma, Nb. Tanaka, and J. Murata (2009) New or noteworthy plant collections from Myanmar (3) Caldesia parnassifolia, Nechamandra alternifolia, Potamogeton maackianus and P. octandrus. Journal of Japanese Botany 84: 321-329.
Ito, Y., T. Ohi-Toma, Nb. Tanaka, Nr. Tanaka & J. Murata (2014) New or noteworthy plant collections from Myanmar (8) Blyxa aubertii var. echinosperma, Lemna trisulca, and Najas tenuis. APG: Acta Phytotaxonomica et Geobotanica 65: 53-61.
Ito, Y., Nr. Tanaka, R. Pooma, and Nb. Tanaka (2014) DNA barcoding reveals a new record of Potamogeton distinctus (Potamogetonaceae) and its natural hybrids, P. distinctus × P. nodosus and P. distinctus × P. wrightii (P. ×malainoides) from Myanmar. Biodiversity Data Journal 2: e1073. doi: 10.3897/BDJ.2.e1073
Ito, Y., Nb. Tanaka (2014) Chromosome studies in the aquatic monocots of Myanmar: A brief review with additional records. Biodiversity Data Journal 2: e1069. doi: 10.3897/BDJ.2.e1069

References
Notes

External links
 The utilization of edible Canna plants in southeastern Asia and southern China
 On the Genus Canna in Yaeyama Islands, the Ryukyus, Japan
 Edible Canna and its Starch: An Under-Exploited Starch-Producing Plant Resource
 Progress in the Development of Economic Botany and Knowledge of Food Plants.
 The Asia-Pacific Network for Global Change Research (APN) Newsletter Jan 2008

Cannaceae
20th-century Japanese botanists
Economic botanists
Living people
Year of birth missing (living people)
21st-century Japanese botanists